Transwestern is a privately held real estate firm providing Agency Leasing, Tenant Advisory, Capital Markets, Asset Services and Research to owners of commercial real estate.

History

In 1978, the company was founded as a real estate development company by Robert Duncan.

During the recession of the late 1980s and early 1990s, the company converted into a services business.

Beginning in 1994, the company expanded into the West, Southwest and Midwest regions of the United States.

In 1995, the company acquired Delta Associates, a provider of market research.

In 1998, the company acquired Carey Winston, the largest commercial real estate broker in the Washington, D.C. metropolitan area. That year, Transwestern Commercial co-founder and chairman Randall K. Rowe was elected chairman of the National Realty Committee. 

In January 2001, the company brokered a $113 million, 15-year lease for Oblon in Arlington, Virginia.

In January 2011, Transwestern acquired Fort Worth-based NAI Huff Partners.

In September 2013, Transwestern acquired the Boston firm of Richards Barry Joyce & Partners LLC.

In January 2014, the company acquired Epic Realty Partners LLC, based in Chicago, Illinois, to grow its industrial business.

In March 2014, the company formed a joint venture with the principals of Chicago-based Ridge Property Trust called Ridge Development to expand its industrial development platform.

In February 2015, Transwestern Strategic Partners, the discretionary investment management arm of the company, acquired a property in Scottsdale, Arizona for $58.5 million.

In March 2017, the company acquired Chicago-based tenant advisory firm Tru Office Advisors.

References

Real estate companies established in 1978
Companies based in Houston
Real estate services companies of the United States